Sony Ericsson Z610 was a cellphone made by Sony Ericsson. It was launched in 2006. It had a 176x220 pixels main screen, a secondary screen on the back, a 950 mAh Li-Ion battery, a 2 MP camera on the back and another one on the front. It had Bluetooth 2.0, 900/1800/1900 GSM and 2100 UMTS bands.

References

External links 
https://www.gsmarena.com/sony_ericsson_z610-1665.php
Sony Ericsson Z610i review

Mobile phones introduced in 2006
Sony Ericsson mobile phones